During the 2005–06 season, Charlton Athletic competed in the FA Premier League.

Season summary
Charlton started the season well, coming third at the end of August, second at the end of September and fifth at the end of October, but fell away during the second half of the season to finish in the lower half of the table in thirteenth. At the end of the season, manager Alan Curbishley resigned after 15 years at the club - 10 as manager - amidst rumours the FA was going to approach him with an offer to manage the English national side (the job eventually went to Middlesbrough's Steve McLaren). Curbishley was replaced by Iain Dowie, who infamously left South London rivals Crystal Palace, claiming he wanted to be closer to his family in Bolton - only to join the Addicks.

Striker Darren Bent, signed from Championship side Ipswich Town, made a significant impact in his first full Premiership season, scoring 18 goals (22 in all competitions) to finish as the third highest scorer in the league and the highest scoring Englishman. Unfortunately for him his prolific scoring was not enough for him to make England's World Cup squad, with Arsenal's 17-year-old striker Theo Walcott a surprise inclusion ahead of him.

Kit
After two seasons Charlton changed their home kit, although Spanish apparel manufacturers Joma remained the suppliers. During the season, however, kit sponsors all:sports went bankrupt; Charlton then signed a sponsorship deal with Spanish real estate company Llanera through to the end of the 2007–08 season.

For the club's centenary, in a match in October Charlton wore a special centenary kit with a white band down the left-hand side of the shirt and a red band down the left-hand side of the shorts.

Final league table

Results per matchday

Results
Charlton Athletic's score comes first

Legend

FA Premier League

FA Cup

League Cup

Players

First-team squad
Squad at end of season

Left club during season

Transfers In

Summer

Winter

Transfers Out

Summer

Winter

Statistics

Starting 11
Considering starts in all competitions
 GK: #36,  Thomas Myhre, 26
 RB: #2,  Luke Young, 38
 CB: #6,  Chris Perry, 30
 CB: #3,  Hermann Hreidarsson, 42
 LB: #22,  Chris Powell, 32
 RM: #19,  Dennis Rommedahl, 22
 CM: #8,  Matt Holland, 26
 CM: #7,  Radostin Kishishev, 40
 CM: #20,  Bryan Hughes, 28
 LM: #18,   Darren Ambrose, 22
 CF: #10, Darren Bent, 43

Awards
 August Premier League Player of the Month: Darren Bent
 September Premier League Player of the Month: Danny Murphy

References

Notes

Charlton Athletic F.C. seasons
Charlton Athletic